Liardetia boninensis is a species of small air-breathing land snails, terrestrial pulmonate gastropod mollusks in the family Euconulidae, the hive snails. This species is endemic to Japan.

References

Molluscs of Japan
Liardetia
Taxonomy articles created by Polbot